The year 1985 was designated as the International Youth Year by the United Nations.

Events

January

 January 1
 The Internet's Domain Name System is created.
 Greenland withdraws from the European Economic Community as a result of a new agreement on fishing rights.
 January 7 – Japan Aerospace Exploration Agency launches Sakigake, Japan's first interplanetary spacecraft and the first deep space probe to be launched by any country other than the United States or the Soviet Union.
 January 15 – Tancredo Neves is elected president of Brazil by the Congress, ending the 21-year military rule.
 January 20 – Ronald Reagan is privately sworn in for a second term as President of the United States.
 January 27 – The Economic Cooperation Organization (ECO) is formed, in Tehran.
 January 28 – The charity single record "We Are the World" is recorded by USA for Africa.

February

 February 4 – The border between Gibraltar and Spain reopens for the first time since Francisco Franco closed it in 1969.
 February 5 – Australia cancels its involvement in U.S.-led MX missile tests.
 February 9 – U.S. drug agent Kiki Camarena is kidnapped and murdered in Mexico by drug traffickers; his body is later discovered on March 5.
 February 14 – Lebanon hostage crisis: CNN reporter Jeremy Levin is freed from captivity in Lebanon.
 February 16
 Israel begins withdrawing troops from Lebanon.
 The ideology of Hezbollah is declared in a program issued in Beirut.
 February 19
William J. Schroeder becomes the first artificial heart patient to leave the hospital.
Iberia Airlines Flight 610 crashes killing all 148 on board.
China Airlines Flight 006 is involved in a mid-air incident; while there are 22 minor injuries and 2 serious injuries, no one is killed.
 February 20 – Minolta releases the Maxxum 7000, the world's first autofocus single-lens reflex camera.
 February 28 – The Provisional Irish Republican Army carries out a mortar attack on the Royal Ulster Constabulary police station at Newry in Northern Ireland. With nine officers dead, it is the highest loss of life for the RUC on a single day.

March

 March – The GNU Manifesto, written by Richard Stallman, is first published.
 March 1 – After a 12-year-long dictatorship, Julio María Sanguinetti is sworn in as the first democratically elected President of Uruguay.
 March 3 – The 8.0  Algarrobo earthquake hits Santiago and Valparaíso, Chile, leaving 177 dead, 2,575 injured, 142,489 houses destroyed, and approximately a million people homeless.
 March 8 – A Beirut car bomb, planted in an attempt to assassinate Islamic cleric Sayyed Mohammad Hussein Fadlallah, kills more than 80 people and injures 200 more.
 March 11
Mikhail Gorbachev becomes General Secretary of the Soviet Communist Party and de facto leader of the Soviet Union.
 Mohamed Al-Fayed buys the London-based department store company Harrods.
 March 15 – Vice-president José Sarney, upon becoming vice president, assumes the duties of president of Brazil, as the new president Tancredo Neves had become severely ill the day before. Sarney would later become Brazil's first civilian president in 21 years, upon Neves' death on April 21. 
 March 16 – Lebanon hostage crisis: US journalist Terry Anderson is taken hostage in Beirut; he remains a prisoner until December 4, 1991.
 March 17 – Expo '85, an international exhibition, opens in Tsukuba, Ibaraki, Japan, running until September 16.
 March 18 – Australia's longest-running soap opera, Neighbours, debuts on Seven Network.
 March 21 – Canadian paraplegic athlete and activist Rick Hansen sets out on his , 26-month Man in Motion tour which raises US$26 million for spinal cord research and quality of life initiatives.
 March 25
 The 57th Academy Awards are held in Los Angeles, with Amadeus winning Best Picture.
 The Organization Commune Africaine et Malgache is officially dissolved.
 March 31 – The inaugural WrestleMania is held in Madison Square Garden, New York, and is main-“evented by Hulk Hogan and Mr. T vs. Paul Orndorff and Roddy Piper in a tag-team match.

April

Soviet–Afghan War: The Soviet Union begins to transfer the burden of fighting the mujahideen to the armed forces of the Democratic Republic of Afghanistan, a cause of the Revolutions of 1989.
 April 1 – Telegraph and Telephone Public Corporation, and Japan Tobacco and Salt Public Corporation, are privatized and change their names to Nippon Telegraph and Telephone, and Japan Tobacco.
 April 12 – El Descanso bombing: A terrorist bombing attributed to the Islamic Jihad Organization in the El Descanso restaurant near Madrid, Spain, mostly attended by U.S. personnel from the Torrejón Air Base, causes 18 deaths (all Spaniards) and 82 injuries.
 April 15 – South Africa ends its ban on interracial marriages.
 April 19 – The Soviet Union performs a nuclear weapon test in eastern Kazakhstan.
 April 23 – Coca-Cola changes its formula and releases New Coke. The response is overwhelmingly negative and the original formula is back on the market in less than three months.
 April 28 – The Australian Nuclear Disarmament Party (NDP) splits.

May

 May 4 – The 30th Eurovision Song Contest takes place in Gothenburg, Sweden and is won by the Bobbysocks! song La det swinge for Norway.
 May 5 – U.S. President Ronald Reagan joins West German Chancellor Helmut Kohl for a controversial funeral service at a cemetery in Bitburg, West Germany, which includes the graves of 59 elite S.S. troops from World War II.
 May 9 – The 3rd total Victory Day Parade (the first being in 1945 and the next in 1965) is held on Red Square in Moscow in the Soviet Union. It features T-34-85 tanks, veterans of World War II from Poland, Czechoslovakia and the Soviet Union, and is the first parade to be held during the reign of Mikhail Gorbachev.
 May 11
 The FBI brings charges against the suspected heads of the five Mafia families in New York City.
 Bradford City stadium fire: A fire engulfs a wooden stand at the Valley Parade stadium in Bradford, England, during an Association football match, killing 56 people.
 May 15 – Argentine President Raúl Alfonsín terminates Argentine administration of the Falkland Islands but does not relinquish Argentina's claim to the islands.
 May 16 – Scientists of the British Antarctic Survey announce the discovery of the ozone hole.
 May 25 – Approximately 10,000 people are killed when Bangladesh is affected by the storm surge from Tropical Storm One (1B).
 May 26 – Young driver Danny Sullivan beats veteran Mario Andretti to win the 1985 Indianapolis 500.
 May 29 – Heysel Stadium disaster: Thirty-nine spectators are killed in rioting on the terraces during the European Cup final between Liverpool F.C. and Juventus (0–1) at Heysel Stadium in Brussels, Belgium.
 May 31 – Forty-four tornadoes hit Ohio, Pennsylvania, New York and Ontario, including a rare powerful F5. In total, the event killed 90 people.

June

 June 6 – The remains of Josef Mengele, the physician notorious for Nazi human experimentation on inmates of Auschwitz concentration camp, buried in 1979 under the name of Wolfgang Gerhard, are exhumed in Embu das Artes, Brazil.
June 14
TWA Flight 847, carrying 153 passengers from Athens to Rome, is hijacked by a Hezbollah fringe group. One passenger, U.S. Navy Petty Officer Robert Stethem, is killed. Greek police arrest a 65-year-old Lebanese suspect on September 21, 2019.
 The Schengen Agreement is signed between certain member states of the European Economic Community, creating the Schengen Area, a bloc of (at this time) 5 states with no internal border controls.
 June 15 – Studio Ghibli, an animation studio, is founded in Tokyo.
 June 20 – 1985 Nepal bombings: A series of bomb blasts occurs in Kathmandu and other cities of Nepal.
 June 22 – British and Irish police foil a "mainland bombing campaign" sponsored by the Provisional Irish Republican Army which targets luxury vacation resorts.
 June 23 – Air India Flight 182, a Boeing 747, is blown up by a terrorist bomb 31,000 feet (9,500 m) above the Atlantic Ocean, south of Ireland, on a Montreal–London–Delhi flight, killing all 329 aboard.
 June 24 – STS-51-G: Space Shuttle Discovery completes its mission, best remembered for having Sultan bin Salman Al Saud, the first Arab and first Muslim in space, as a payload specialist.
 June 27 – The iconic U.S. Route 66 is officially decommissioned.

July

 July 1 – The Convention on the Transfer of Sentenced Persons enters into force.
 July 10 – The Greenpeace vessel Rainbow Warrior is bombed and sunk in Auckland Harbour by French DGSE agents.
 July 13 – Live Aid benefit concerts in London and Philadelphia raise over £50 million for famine relief in Ethiopia.
 July 19
New Hampshire teacher Christa McAuliffe is selected as the first person to go into space under the Teacher in Space Project, and designated to ride aboard the Space Shuttle Challenger.
 The Val di Stava dam collapses in Italy, killing 268 people, destroying 63 buildings, and demolishing eight bridges.
 July 20 – State President of South Africa, P. W. Botha, declares a state of emergency in 36 magisterial districts of South Africa amid growing civil unrest in black townships.
 July 27 – The 63 Building officially opens as the tallest skyscraper outside North America in Yeouido, Seoul, South Korea.

August
 August 2 – Delta Air Lines Flight 191 crashes near Dallas, Texas, killing 137 people.
 August 7 – Takao Doi, Mamoru Mohri and Chiaki Mukai are chosen to be Japan's first astronauts.
 August 12 – Japan Airlines Flight 123 crashes in Japan, killing 520 people (the worst single-aircraft disaster in history).
 August 14 – The Accomarca massacre takes place in Ayacucho, Peru.
 August 22 – British Airtours Flight 28M: The 737's left engine catches fire while on its takeoff roll at Manchester Airport in the UK and 55 people are killed while trying to evacuate the aircraft.
 August 25 – Bar Harbor Airlines Flight 1808 crashes in the United States killing all 8 on board including thirteen-year-old American celebrity schoolgirl Samantha Smith.

September
 September 1 – The wreck of the RMS Titanic is located by a joint American-French expedition led by Dr. Robert Ballard (WHOI) and Jean-Louis Michel (IFREMER) using side-scan sonar from RV Knorr.
 September 6 – Midwest Express Airlines Flight 105, a Douglas DC-9, crashes just after takeoff from Milwaukee, killing all 31 on board.
 September 13 – Super Mario Bros. is released for the Nintendo Entertainment System. 
 September 19 – An 8.0  earthquake strikes Mexico City, killing between 5,000 and 45,000 people and injuring 30,000 more.
 September 20 – The capital gains tax is introduced to Australia.
 September 22 – The Plaza Accord is signed by five nations.
 
 September 22 – Artists Christo and Jeanne-Claude wrap the Pont Neuf, the oldest bridge in Paris, for two weeks (22 Sep - 5 Oct 1985). The Pont Neuf Wrapped attracted three million visitors.

 September 23 – Italian crime reporter Giancarlo Siani is killed by the Camorra.

October
 October 1 – Operation Wooden Leg: The Israeli air force bombs Palestine Liberation Organization headquarters near Tunis.
 October 3 – The Space Shuttle Atlantis makes its maiden flight.
 October 7 – The cruise ship Achille Lauro is hijacked in the Mediterranean Sea by four heavily armed Palestinian terrorists. One passenger, American Leon Klinghoffer, is killed.
 October 16 – The Finnish dry cargo ship MS Hanna-Marjut, on its way from Mariehamn to Naantali, sank in hard sea on the open water of Kihti between the Kökar and Sottunga islands of Åland, leading to the drowning of four people.
 October 25 – Emirates Airlines is established in Dubai and makes its first flight, to Karachi.

November
 November 6
 Palace of Justice siege: Members of the 19th of April Movement (M-19) Marxist guerrilla group take over the Palace of Justice of Colombia in Bogotá and hold the Supreme Court hostage. Hours later, after a military raid, the incident leaves almost half of the 25 Supreme Court Justices dead.
 The Argentine tourist village of Villa Epecuén is permanently flooded through the collapse of a dam and dyke.
 November 9 – In an all-Soviet match, 22-year-old Garry Kasparov defeats Anatoly Karpov to become the youngest-ever undisputed winner of the World Chess Championship.
 November 12 – A total solar eclipse occurs over Antarctica at 14:11:22 UTC.
 November 13 – Armero tragedy: The Nevado del Ruiz volcano erupts, killing an estimated 23,000 people, including 21,000 killed by lahars, in the town of Armero, Colombia.
 November 19 – Cold War: In Geneva, U.S. President Ronald Reagan and Soviet Union leader Mikhail Gorbachev meet for the first time.
 November 20 – Microsoft Corporation releases the first international release of Windows 1.0.
 November 23 – EgyptAir Flight 648 is hijacked by the Abu Nidal group and flown to Malta, where Egyptian commandos storm the plane; 60 are killed by gunfire and explosions.
 November 25 – 1985 Aeroflot Antonov An-12 shoot-down: A Soviet Aeroflot Antonov An-12 cargo airplane, en route from Cuito Cuanavale to Luanda, is shot down by South African Special Forces and crashes approximately 43 km east of Menongue, the provincial center of the Cuando Cubango Province, Angola, killing 8 crew members and 13 passengers on board.
 November 29 – Gérard Hoarau, exiled political leader from the Seychelles, is assassinated in London.

December
 December 1
 The Organization of Ibero-American States for Education, Science and Culture (Spanish: Organización e Estados Iberoamericanos para la Educación la Ciencia y la Cultura; OEI) is created.
 The Ford Taurus and Mercury Sable are released for sale to the public in the US.
 December 8 – The South Asian Association for Regional Cooperation (SAARC) is established.
 December 11 – Hugh Scrutton is killed outside his Sacramento, California computer rental store by a Unabomber explosive, becoming the first fatality of the bombing campaign.
 December 12 – Arrow Air Flight 1285, a Douglas DC-8, crashes after takeoff from Gander, Newfoundland, killing 256 people – 248 of whom were U.S. servicemen returning to Fort Campbell, Kentucky, after overseeing a peacekeeping force in the Sinai Peninsula.
 December 20 – Pope John Paul II announces the instituting of World Youth Day for Catholic youths.
 December 27
Rome and Vienna airport attacks: Abu Nidal terrorists open fire in the airports of Rome and Vienna, leaving 18 dead and 120 injured.
 American naturalist Dian Fossey is found brutally murdered in Rwanda.

Date unknown
 The fullerene Buckminsterfullerene (C60) is first intentionally prepared by Harold Kroto, James R. Heath, Sean O'Brien, Robert Curl and Richard Smalley at Rice University in the US.
 DNA is first used in a criminal case.
 The 1983–85 famine in Ethiopia continues; USA for Africa (We Are the World) and Live Aid raise funds for famine relief.
 The Union for Aromanian Language and Culture, an Aromanian cultural organization, is founded in Freiburg im Breisgau by the Aromanian professor .
 Africa has a population growth of 3.2 percent per year.

World population

Births

January

 January 1
 Jeff Carter, Canadian hockey player
 Steven Davis, Northern Irish footballer
 Donia Samir Ghanem, Egyptian actress and singer
 January 2
 Ivan Dodig, Croatian tennis player
 Teng Haibin, Chinese gymnast
 Carla Juri, Swiss actress
 Heather O'Reilly, U.S. women's national soccer player
 January 3 – Asa Akira, American adult actress
 January 7 – Lewis Hamilton, British 7-Time Formula One world champion
 January 8 – Oh Ha-na, South Korean fencer
 January 9 – Juanfran, Spanish footballer
 January 11 – Aja Naomi King, American actress
 January 12 – Xiao Qin, Chinese gymnast
 January 14 – Delfine Persoon, Belgian boxer
 January 16 
 Şahika Ercümen, Turkish dietitian and world record holder free-diver
 Sidharth Malhotra, Indian actor
 Pablo Zabaleta, Argentine football player and coach
 January 17
 Kangin, Korean singer (Super Junior)
 Simone Simons, Dutch metal singer (Epica) 
 January 18 
 Minissha Lamba, Indian actress
 Riccardo Montolivo, Italian footballer
 January 19
 Damien Chazelle, American film director and screenwriter
 Benny Feilhaber, Brazilian-born footballer
 Horia Tecău, Romanian tennis player
 Duško Tošić, Serbian footballer
 January 20 – Ehsan Haddadi, Iranian discus thrower
 January 21 – Aura Dione, Danish pop musician
 January 23 – Doutzen Kroes, Dutch supermodel
 January 25 
 Tina Karol, Ukrainian singer
 Christina Ochoa, Spanish actress science communicator, producer and author
 January 27 – Eric Radford, Canadian pair skater
 January 28
 J. Cole, American hip-hop musician and record producer
 Libby Trickett, Australian swimmer
 January 29
 Liu Chunhong, Chinese weightlifter
 Marc Gasol, Spanish basketball player
 Isabel Lucas, Australian actress
 January 30 
 Gisela Dulko, Argentine tennis player
 Ximena Duque, Colombian actress and model
 Kevin Kiley, American politician
 January 31 – Kalomira, Greek-American singer and model

February

 February 5 – Cristiano Ronaldo, Portuguese footballer
 February 6
 Joji Kato, Japanese speed skater
 Sofia Nizharadze, Georgian singer
 Crystal Reed, American actress
 February 7
 Donald Moatshe, South African musician
 Deborah Ann Woll, American actress
 February 9
 David Gallagher, American actor
 Marcin Możdżonek, Polish volleyball paleyrr
 February 10 – Lydia Valentín, Spanish weightlifter
 February 11 – Casey Dellacqua, Australian tennis player
 February 14 
 Havana Brown, Australian Australian DJ and singer
 Philippe Senderos, Swiss footballer
 February 15
 Luis Carlos Díaz, Venezuelan journalist
 Natalie Morales, American actress 
 February 17 – Anne Curtis, Filipino-Australian actress, model and television host
 February 19
 Haylie Duff, American actress and singer
 Arielle Kebbel, American model and actress
 February 21 – Georgios Samaras, Greek footballer
 February 22 – Hameur Bouazza, Algerian footballer
 February 24 – William Kvist, Danish footballer
 February 25
 Benji Marshall, New Zealand rugby league player
 Joakim Noah, American basketball player
 February 26 
 Fernando Llorente, Spanish footballer
 Sanya Richards-Ross, Jamaican born-American track and field athlete
 February 28
 Fefe Dobson, Canadian pop and rock singer
 Jelena Janković, Serbian tennis player
 Diego Ribas da Cunha, Brazilian soccer player

March

 March 2 – Patrick Makau Musyoki, Kenyan long-distance runner
 March 9 – Brent Burns, Canadian Ice Hockey player
 March 10 – Lassana Diarra, French footballer
 March 11
 Ajantha Mendis, Sri Lankan cricketer
 Hakuhō Shō, Mongolian wrestler, 69th Yokozuna
 March 12 – Stromae, Belgian musician
 March 13 – Emile Hirsch, American actor
 March 15
 Antti Autti, Finnish snowboarder
 Kellan Lutz, American fashion model and actor
 March 18 – Bianca King, Filipina actress and model
 March 21 – Sonequa Martin-Green, American actress
 March 22 – Jakob Fuglsang, Danish cyclist
 March 23 – Bethanie Mattek-Sands, American tennis player
 March 24 – Sayaka Hirano, Japanese table tennis player
 March 26
 Matt Grevers, American Olympic swimmer
 Stéphane Séjourné, French lawyer and politician
 Jonathan Groff, American actor, singer and dancer
 Keira Knightley, English actress 
 March 27 – Ram Charan, Indian film actor
 March 28 – Stan Wawrinka, Swiss tennis player
 March 31 – Jessica Szohr, American actress

April

 April 2 – Stéphane Lambiel, Swiss figure skater
 April 3
 Leona Lewis, British pop musician
 Jari-Matti Latvala, Finnish racing driver
 April 4 
 Rudy Fernández, Spanish professional basketball player
 Ricardo Vilar, Brazilian footballer
 April 6 – Frank Ongfiang, Cameroonian footballer
 April 7 – Saad Lamjarred, Moroccan singer
 April 8 – Yemane Tsegay, Ethiopian marathon runner
 April 9 – Tomohisa Yamashita, Japanese singer and actor
 April 10 – Wang Meng, Chinese short track skater
 April 12
 Shakhriyar Mamedyarov, Azerbaijani chess grandmaster
 Olga Seryabkina, Russian pop musician 
 Hitomi Yoshizawa, Japanese singer and actress
 April 13 – Carmen Carrera, American model
 April 16 – Benjamín Rojas, Argentine singer and actor
 April 17
 Rooney Mara, American film and television actress
 Luke Mitchell, Australian actor and model
 Jo-Wilfried Tsonga, French tennis player
 April 18 
 Łukasz Fabiański, Polish footballer
 Elena Temnikova, Russian pop singer 
 April 19
 Valon Behrami, Kosovan born-Swiss footballer
 Zhang Xi, Chinese beach volleyball player
 April 22
 Camille Lacourt, French swimmer
 Kseniya Simonova, Ukrainian performance artist
 April 25 – Andrea Coda, Italian footballer
 April 26 
 Nam Gyu-ri, South Korean singer and actress
 John Isner, American tennis player
 April 27 – Horacio Zeballos, Argentine tennis player
 April 30 
 Gal Gadot, Israeli actress and model
 Michael Mørkøv, Danish track cyclist

May

 May 2
 Lily Allen, British pop musician
 Kyle Busch, American race car driver
 Alexander Galimov, Russian hockey player (d. 2011)
 Sarah Hughes, American figure skater
 Shpat Kasapi, Albanian-Macedonian singer and songwriter
 May 3 
 Anielle Franco, Brazilian politician
 Ezequiel Lavezzi, Argentine footballer
 May 4 – Fernandinho, Brazilian footballer
 May 5 – P. J. Tucker, American basketball player
 May 6 – Chris Paul, American basketball player
 May 7 – J Balvin, Colombian reggaeton singer, in Medellín 
 May 8 – Silvia Stroescu, Romanian artistic gymnast
 May 12 – Dániel Tőzsér, Hungarian footballer
 May 13 
 Javier Balboa, Spanish born-Equatorial Guinean footballer
 Jaroslav Halák, Slovak Ice Hockey player
 May 14
 Lina Esco, American actress, producer and activist
 Sally Martin, New Zealand actress
 Zack Ryder, American professional wrestler
 May 15 
 Tania Cagnotto, Italian diver
 Cristiane, Brazilian footballer
 May 16 – Andrew Keenan-Bolger, American actor, writer and director
 May 17 
 Derek Hough, American dancer, choreographer and musician, six-time winner of Dancing with the Stars
 Christine Nesbitt, Canadian speed skater
 May 18 – Oliver Sin, Hungarian painter
 May 20 – Chris Froome, Kenyan-born British road racing cyclist
 May 21
 Mutya Buena, British urban singer (Sugababes)
 Mark Cavendish, Manx-born road racing cyclist
 Alexander Dale Oen, Norwegian swimmer (d.2012)
 Lucie Hradecká, Czech tennis player
 Kano, British rapper, songwriter and actor 
 Sasha Pivovarova, Russian model
 May 22 
 Tranquillo Barnetta, Swiss footballer
 Chrissie Chau, Hong Kong model
 May 25
 Luciana Abreu, Portuguese pop singer and actress
 Lauren Frost, American actress and singer
 Roman Reigns, American professional wrestler
 Alexis Texas, American adult actress
 May 27 
 Chien-Ming Chiang, Taiwanese baseball player
 Roberto Soldado, Spanish footballer
 May 28
 Colbie Caillat, American musician
 Carey Mulligan, British actress
 May 29 
 Hernanes, Brazilian footballer 
 Yu Jing, Chinese speed skater
 May 31 – Zoraida Gómez, Mexican actress

June

 June 1 – Tirunesh Dibaba, Ethiopian athlete
June 4
 Dominique Gisin, Swiss alpine skier
 Anna-Lena Grönefeld, American tennis player
 Evan Lysacek, American figure skater
 Lukas Podolski, German footballer
 Bar Refaeli, Israeli model and occasional actress
 June 5 – Rubén de la Red, Spanish footballer
 June 7 – Richard Thompson, Trinidadian sprinter
 June 8 – Sofya Velikaya, Russian fencer
 June 9 – Sonam Kapoor, Indian actress and model
 June 10 – Andy Schleck, Luxembourgish road cyclist
 June 11 – Dmitry Koldun, Belarusian singer
 June 12 – Dave Franco, American actor, voice actor, and filmmaker 
 June 15 – Nadine Coyle, Irish singer 
 June 17
 Kateryna Handziuk, Ukrainian politician (d. 2018)
 Marcos Baghdatis, Cypriot tennis player
 June 18 – Alex Hirsch, American animator and voice actor
 June 20 – Darko Miličić, Serbian basketball player
 June 21 – Lana Del Rey, American pop musician
 June 24 – Krunoslav Simon, Croatian basketball player
 June 25 
 Annaleigh Ashford, American actress, singer and dancer
 Scott Brown, Scottish footballer
 June 26
 Arjun Kapoor, Indian actor 
 Ogyen Trinley Dorje, Tibetan Buddhist spiritual leader
 June 27
 James Hook, Welsh rugby union player
 Svetlana Kuznetsova, Russian tennis player
 Nico Rosberg, German 2016 Formula 1 world champion
 June 28 – Ahmed Kantari, Moroccan footballer
 June 30
 Michael Phelps, American swimmer
 Cody Rhodes, American professional wrestler

July

 July 1
 Sebalter, Swiss pop musician and fiddle player
 Léa Seydoux, French actress
 July 2
 Gábor Máthé, Hungarian Deaflympic Champion in tennis
 Pak Nam-chol, North Korean footballer
 Ashley Tisdale, American actress, singer and producer
 Vlatko Ilievski, Macedonian singer and actor (d. 2018)
 July 5 – François Arnaud, French-Canadian actor 
 July 6 
 Ranveer Singh, Bollywood actor
 Melisa Sözen, Turkish actress
 July 7 
 Pong Escobal, Filipino basketball player 
 Langton Rusere, Zimbabwean cricket umpire
 Seo Woo, Korean actress
 July 9
 Cris Cyborg, Brazilian mixed martial artist
 Cathy Leung, Hong Kong singer
 Ashley Young, English footballer
 July 10
 Mario Gómez, German footballer
 Park Chu-young South Korean footballer
 July 11 – Lilian Marijnissen, Dutch politician
 July 12
 Emil Hegle Svendsen, Norwegian biathlete
 Natasha Poly, Russian model
 Sami Zayn, Canadian professional wrestler
 July 13
 Charlotte Dujardin, English dressage rider
 Guillermo Ochoa, Mexican footballer
 Andrew Wolff, Filipino-British rugby player
 July 14 
 Oleksandr Pyatnytsya, Ukrainian javelin thrower
 Lee Kwang-soo, South Korean actor, entertainer and model
 July 15 
Tomer Kapon, Israeli actor
Agniya Kuznetsova, Russian actress
 July 16
 Cha Ye-ryun, South Korean actress
 Yōko Hikasa, Japanese actress
 Rosa Salazar, American actress
 July 17
 Tom Fletcher, British musician
 Caitlin Van Zandt, American actress
 July 18
 Hopsin, American rapper and record producer
 James Norton, British actor
 Chace Crawford, American actor
 July 19 – LaMarcus Aldridge, American basketball player
 July 20 – John Francis Daley, American television and film actor
 July 21 
 Guillaume Bastille, Canadian short track speed skater
 Filip Polášek, Slovak tennis player
 July 22
 Jessica Abbott, Australian swimmer
 Ryan Dolan, Irish singer
 Takudzwa Ngwenya, Zimbabwean-American rugby player
 Akira Tozawa, Japanese wrestler
 July 25
 James Lafferty, American actor
 Shantel VanSanten, American actress and model
 Nelson Piquet Jr., Brazilian Formula One and NASCAR driver
 July 27 – Lou Taylor Pucci, American actor
 July 30 – Elena Gheorghe, Romanian singer
 July 31 
 Allie X, Canadian singer, songwriter and visual artist
 Eva Yaneva, Bulgarian volleyball player

August

 August 2 – Davey Boy Smith Jr., Canadian professional wrestler
 August 3 
 Sonny Bill Williams, New Zealand rugby league and rugby union player and boxer
 Georgina Haig, Australian actress
 August 4 
 Crystal Bowersox, American singer-songwriter
 Antonio Valencia, Ecuadorian footballer
 August 5 – Salomon Kalou, Ivorian footballer
 August 6 – Bafétimbi Gomis, French footballer
 August 8 
 Toby Flood, English rugby union player
 Anita Włodarczyk, Polish hammer thrower
 August 9
 Anna Kendrick, American actress
 Filipe Luís, Brazilian footballer
 August 11 
 Asher Roth, American rapper
 Jacqueline Fernandez, Bahraini–Sri Lankan actress
 August 12 
 Osmany Juantorena, Cuban born-Italian volleyball player
 África Zavala, Mexican actress
 August 13 – Olubayo Adefemi, Nigerian footballer (d.2011)
 August 14 – Shea Weber, Canadian ice hockey player
 August 15
 Emily Kinney, American actress, singer, and songwriter
 Nipsey Hussle, American rapper (d. 2019)
 August 16
 Arden Cho, American actress, singer and model
 Cristin Milioti, American actress and singer 
 August 17 – Evgeny Konobry, Russian professional ice hockey player
 August 21 – Laura Haddock, English actress
 August 24 – Hamid Sourian, Iranian wrestler
 August 25 – Rada Manojlović, Serbian singer
 August 27 – Kayla Ewell, American actress
 August 30
 Tianna Bartoletta, American long jumper
 Leisel Jones, Australian swimmer
 Éva Risztov, Hungarian Olympic Champion swimmer
 Eamon Sullivan, Australian swimmer
 August 31 
 Marina Alabau, Spanish windsurfer
 Mohammed bin Salman, Crown Prince of Saudi Arabia.

September

 September 4
 Raúl Albiol, Spanish footballer
 Ri Kwang-chon, North Korean footballer
 September 7
 Radhika Apte, Indian film and theatre actress
 Alyona Lanskaya, Belarusian singer
 Rafinha, Brazilian football player
 September 8 
 Vanessa Baden, American actress, writer, director, and producer
 Denny Morrison, Canadian speed skater
 September 9
 Lior Eliyahu, Israeli basketball player
 Amy Manson, British actress
 Luka Modrić, Croatian football player
 Liliyana Natsir, Indonesian badminton player
 J. R. Smith, American basketball player
 September 12 – Headhunterz, Dutch DJ and music producer
 September 14 
 Vanessa Fernandes, Portuguese triathlete
 Aya Ueto, Japanese actress
 September 15 – Iselin Steiro, Norwegian model
 September 16
 Madeline Zima, American actress
 Max Minghella, English actor
 September 17 
 Tomáš Berdych, Czech tennis player
 Alexander Ovechkin, Russian hockey player
 September 18 – Stoyka Krasteva, Bulgarian boxer
 September 19 – Alun Wyn Jones, Welsh rugby union player
 September 20 – Tessanne Chin, Jamaican singer, winner of The Voice season 5
 September 22 – Tatiana Maslany, Canadian actress
 September 23 – Maki Goto, Japanese singer and actress
 September 24 – Jessica Lucas, Canadian actress
 September 26 – Marcin Mroziński, Polish actor, singer and television presenter
 September 28 – Shindong, Korean singer 
 September 29
 Calvin Johnson, retired American football player and contestant on Dancing with the Stars season 23
 Niklas Moisander, Finnish footballer
 Dani Pedrosa, Spanish motorcycle racer
 September 30 
 Cristian Rodríguez, Uruguayan footballer
 T-Pain, American singer-songwriter, rapper, record producer and actor

October

 October 5 – Nicola Roberts, British singer 
 October 6 – Sylvia Fowles, American basketball player
 October 7 – Evan Longoria, American professional baseball player
 October 8 – Bruno Mars, American singer-songwriter and music producer
 October 9 – Sam Oji, English footballer (d. 2021)
 October 10
 Marina Diamandis, Welsh singer-songwriter 
 Kyle Switzer, Canadian actor
 October 11
 Lee Min-hye, South Korean racing cyclist (d. 2018)
 Margaret Berger, Norwegian electropop singer-songwriter
 Michelle Trachtenberg, American actress
 October 12 – Michelle Carter, American shot putter
 October 14 – Sherlyn, Mexican actress
 October 16 
 Casey Stoner, Australian motorcycle racer
 Belén Succi, Argentine field hockey player
 October 20 – Jennifer Freeman, American actress
 October 22 – Hadise, Belgian born-Turkish singer
 October 23
 Chris Neal, English footballer
 Masiela Lusha, Albanian-American actress, poet, and humanitarian
 October 24 – Wayne Rooney, English footballer 
 October 25 – Ciara, African-American singer
 October 26 – Andrea Bargnani, Italian professional basketball player
 October 27 
 Leon Draisaitl, German Ice Hockey player
 Briana Lane, American actress and musician
 October 28 – Troian Bellisario, American actress
 October 29 
 Janet Montgomery, English actress
 Ximena Sariñana, Mexican singer and actress
 October 31 – Kerron Clement, American hurdler and sprinter

November

 November 2 – Diana Penty, Indian model and actress
 November 4 – Marcell Jansen, German footballer
 November 8 – Jack Osbourne, English television personality
 November 10 – Wu Minxia, Chinese diver
 November 11
 Raquel Guerra, Portuguese singer and actress
 Robin Uthappa, Indian cricketer
 November 13
 Rahul Kohli, English actor
 Asdrúbal Cabrera, Venezuelan baseball player
 Simo-Pekka Olli, Finnish volleyball player
 November 14 – Thomas Vermaelen, Belgian footballer
 November 15 – Lily Aldridge, American model
 November 16 – Sanna Marin, Finnish politician, 46th Prime Minister of Finland
 November 18 – Allyson Felix, American sprinter
 November 20
 Aaron Yan, Taiwanese actor and singer 
 Dan Byrd, American actor
 November 21 – Carly Rae Jepsen, Canadian singer-songwriter
 November 22 – Asamoah Gyan, Ghanaian football player
 November 23
 Katie Crown, Canadian voice actress and writer
 Ahn Hyun-Soo, South Korean short track skater
 November 25 – Marcus Hellner, Swedish cross-country skier
 November 26 – Matt Carpenter, American baseball player
 November 27 – Alison Pill, Canadian actress
 November 28 – Magdolna Rúzsa, Hungarian singer
 November 30
 Gia Crovatin, American actress and producer
 Kaley Cuoco, American actress and producer
 Chrissy Teigen, American model

December

 December 1 
 Nathalie Moellhausen, Italian fencer
 Janelle Monáe, African-American R&B/soul musician
 Alicja Rosolska, Polish tennis player
 December 2 – Amaury Leveaux, French swimmer
 December 3 
 László Cseh, Hungarian swimmer
 Amanda Seyfried, American actress, model and singer-songwriter
 December 4 – Krista Siegfrids, Finnish singer
 December 5 – Frankie Muniz, American actor, musician, writer, producer, and race car driver
 December 6 – Dulce María, Mexican singer and actress
 December 7 – Jon Moxley, American professional wrestler
 December 8 – Dwight Howard, American basketball player
 December 9 – Wil Besseling, Dutch golfer
 December 10 – Raven-Symoné, African-American actress, singer, songwriter, executive producer, and director
 December 12 – Juan Camilo Zúñiga, Colombian footballer
 December 15 – Laia Sanz, Spanish motorcycle driver
 December 16 – Amanda Setton, American actress
 December 19 
 Gary Cahill, English footballer
 Tadanari Lee, Japanese footballer
 December 22 – Edurne, Spanish singer, actress, and TV presenter
 December 23 – Harry Judd, English drummer 
 December 24 – Christina Schwanitz, German shot putter
 December 26
 Yu Shirota, Japanese actor and singer
 Beth Behrs, American actress
 December 27
 Jérôme d'Ambrosio, Belgian racing driver
 Jessica Harmon, Canadian actress
 Telma Monteiro, Portuguese judoka
 Paul Stastny, Canadian-American professional ice hockey player
 December 31 – Aliaksandra Herasimenia, Belarusian swimmer

Deaths

January

 January 2 – Gabriel Elorde, Filipino professional boxer (b. 1935)
 January 4 – Sir Brian Horrocks, British general (b. 1895)
 January 5 – Robert L. Surtees, American cinematographer (b. 1906)
 January 11 – Sir William McKell, 12th Governor-General of Australia (b. 1891)
 January 14 
 Jetta Goudal, Dutch actress (b. 1891)
 Anagarika Govinda, German buddhist lama (b. 1898)
 January 18 – Mahmoud Mohammed Taha, Sudanese religious thinker (b. 1909)
 January 19 – Eric Voegelin, German-American philosopher (b. 1901)
 January 22 – Mikhail Gromov, Soviet aviator (b. 1899)
 January 26 – Kenny Clarke, American jazz drummer and bandleader (b. 1914)

February 

 February 4 – Jesse Hibbs, American film director (b. 1906)
 February 6 – Neil McCarthy, English actor (b. 1932)
 February 8
 William Lyons, British automobile engineer and designer (b. 1901)
 Marvin Miller, American actor (b. 1913)
 February 11 – Henry Hathaway, American film director (b. 1898)
 February 12 – Nicholas Colasanto, American actor (b. 1924)
 February 20 – Clarence Nash, American actor (b. 1904)
 February 21
 Ina Claire, American actress (b. 1893)
 Louis Hayward, British actor (b. 1909)
 John G. Trump, American electrical engineer, inventor, and physicist (b. 1907)
 February 22
 Efrem Zimbalist, Russian-American violinist (b. 1889)
 Alexander Scourby, American film, television, and voice actor (b. 1913)
 February 26 – Tjalling Koopmans, Dutch economist, Nobel Prize laureate (b. 1910)
 February 27
 Henry Cabot Lodge Jr., American politician (b. 1902)
 J. Pat O'Malley, English actor (b. 1904)

March

 March 3 – Iosif Shklovsky, Soviet astronomer and astrophysicist (b. 1916)
 March 7 – George Schick, Czechoslovakian conductor and music educator (b. 1908)
 March 8 – Edward Andrews, American actor (b. 1914)
 March 10
 Konstantin Chernenko, Soviet politician, General Secretary of the Communist Party of the Soviet Union (b. 1911)
 Bob Nieman, American baseball player (b. 1927)
 March 11
 Tom Adams, Barbadosian politician, 2nd Prime Minister of Barbados (b. 1931)
 Nazem Akkari, Lebanese politician, 19th Prime Minister of Lebanon (b. 1902)
 March 12 – Eugene Ormandy, Hungarian-American conductor (b. 1899)
 March 13 – Mabel Alvarez, American painter (b. 1891)
 March 15 – Radha Krishna Choudhary, Indian historian (b. 1921)
 March 16 – Roger Sessions, American composer (b. 1896)
 March 21 – Sir Michael Redgrave, British actor (b. 1908)
 March 23
 Doctor Richard Beeching, Chairman of British Rail (b. 1913)
 Zoot Sims, American jazz saxophonist (b. 1925)
 March 28 – Marc Chagall, Russian-born French painter (b. 1887)
 March 29
 The Singing Nun (Jeannine Deckers), Belgian nun and singer (b. 1933)
 Gerhard Stock, German Olympic athlete (b. 1911)
 March 30 – Shizuko Kasagi, Japanese singer (b. 1914)
 March 31 
 Michel Georges-Michel, French painter, journalist, novelist (b. 1883)
 Richard McKeon, American philosopher (b. 1900)

April

 April 4 – Kate Roberts, Welsh-language author (b. 1891)
 April 5 – Paul Hugh Emmett, American chemical engineer (b. 1900)
 April 6 – Terence Sanders, British Olympic rower – coxless fours (b. 1901)
 April 7 – Carl Schmitt, German jurist, political theorist and professor of law (b. 1888)
 April 10 – Alfredo Duhalde, Chilean statesman (b. 1898)
 April 11 – Enver Hoxha, Albanian Communist politician, leader of the Party of Labour 22nd Prime Minister of Albania (b. 1908)
 April 14 – Noele Gordon, British actress (b. 1919)
 April 15 – Jack Medica, American Olympic swimmer (b. 1914)
 April 16 – Scott Brady, American actor (b. 1924)
 April 17 – Evadne Price, Australian-British writer, actress and astrologer (b. 1888)
 April 18 – Gertrude Caton–Thompson, English archaeologist (b. 1888)
 April 19 – Sergei Aleksandrovich Tokarev, Russian ethnologist (b. 1899)
 April 21
 John Welsh, Irish actor (b. 1914)
 Tancredo Neves, Brazilian elected president and former Prime Minister (b. 1910)
 April 26 – Albert Maltz, American screenwriter, one of the Hollywood Ten (b. 1908)

May

 May 1 – Denise Robins, (akas: Francesca Wright, Ashley French, Harriet Gray, Julia Kane) British romance novelist (b. 1897)
 May 4 – Clarence Wiseman, the 10th General of The Salvation Army (b. 1907)
 May 5 – Sir Donald Bailey, British civil engineer (b. 1901)
 May 6
 Pete Desjardins, American Olympic diver (b. 1907)
 Julie Vega, Filipino child actress and singer (b. 1968)
 May 7 – Dawn Addams, British actress (b. 1930)
 May 8
 Karl Marx, German composer and music teacher (b. 1897)
 Theodore Sturgeon, American writer (b. 1918)
 Dolph Sweet, American actor (b. 1920)
 May 9 – Edmond O'Brien, American actor (b. 1915)
 May 10
 Tahar Ben Ammar, Tunisian politician, 8th Prime Minister of Tunisia (b. 1889)
 Florizel von Reuter, American violinist and composer (b. 1890)
 May 12 – Jean Dubuffet, French artist (b. 1901)
 May 13 – Leatrice Joy, American actress (b. 1893)
 May 14 – Barbara Yung, Hong Kong actress (b. 1959)
 May 15 – Rama Devi, Indian nationalist leader (b. 1889)
 May 16 – Margaret Hamilton, American actress (b. 1902)
 May 18 – Penn Nouth, Cambodian politician, 7-time Prime Minister of Cambodia (b. 1906)
 May 19 – Maqbular Rahman Sarkar, Bangladeshi academic (b. 1928)
 May 22 
 Charles Murphy, American architect. (b. 1890)
 Wolfgang Reitherman, German animator, director and producer (b. 1909)

June

 June 5 – Lord George-Brown, British politician (b. 1914)
 June 6
 Norman W. Walker, British businessman (b. 1886)
 Vladimir Jankélévitch, French philosopher and musicologist (b. 1903)
 June 7
 Georgia Hale, American actress (b. 1905)
 June 9 – Clifford Evans, British actor (b. 1912)
 Matsutarō Kawaguchi, Japanese novelist (b. 1899)
 June 10 – George Chandler, American actor (b. 1898)
 June 11 – Karen Ann Quinlan, American right-to-die cause célèbre (b. 1954)
 June 12 – Helmuth Plessner, German philosopher and sociologist (b. 1892)
 June 15 
 Percy Fender, English cricketer (b. 1892)
 Andy Stanfield, American Olympic athlete (b. 1927)
 June 17 
George Jackson, English footballer (b. 1893)
 John Boulting, English filmmaker (b. 1913)
Kirill Moskalenko, Soviet military commander (b. 1902)
 Either June 18 or June 19 - Bonnie Nettles, American religious leader (b. 1927)
 June 21 – Tage Erlander, Swedish politician, 25th Prime Minister of Sweden (b. 1901)
 June 27 – Elias Sarkis, Lebanese lawyer, 27th President of Lebanon (b. 1924)
 June 28 – James Craig, American actor (b. 1912)
 June 30 – Haruo Remeliik, Palauan politician, 1st President of Palau (b. 1933)

July

 July 1 – Pauli Murray, American civil rights activist, lawyer, author and priest (b. 1910)
 July 3 – Erik Ågren, Swedish boxer (b. 1916)
 July 4 – Jan de Quay, Dutch politician and psychologist, 31st Prime Minister of the Netherlands (b. 1901)
 July 8
 Phil Foster, American actor (b. 1913)
 Simon Kuznets, American economist (b. 1901)
 July 9 
 Jimmy Kinnon, Scottish founder of Narcotics Anonymous (b. 1911)
 Charlotte, Grand Duchess of Luxembourg (b. 1896)
 July 14 – Lluís Solé, Spanish geographer and academic (b. 1908)
 July 16 – Heinrich Böll, German writer, Nobel Prize laureate (b. 1917)
 July 17 – Margo, Mexican-born American actress (b. 1917)
 July 19
 Janusz Zajdel, Polish writer (b. 1938)
 Louisa Ghijs, Belgian stage actress and wife of Johannes Heesters (b. 1902)
 July 21 – Alvah Cecil Bessie, American screenwriter, one of the Hollywood Ten (b. 1904)
 July 22 – Matti Järvinen, Finnish Olympic athlete (b. 1909)
 July 23
 Kay Kyser, American bandleader (b. 1905)
 Mickey Shaughnessy, American actor (b. 1920)
 July 25 – Grant Williams, American actor (b. 1931)
 July 26 – Grace Albee, American printmaker and wood engraver. (b. 1890)
 July 27 – John Scarne, American magician and card expert (b. 1903)

August

 August 1 – D. H. Turner, British art historian and museum curator (b. 1931)
 August 2 – Frank Faylen, American actor (b. 1905)
 August 5 – Arnold Horween, Harvard Crimson and NFL football player (b. 1898)
 August 6
 Forbes Burnham, Guyanese political leader, 1st Prime Minister of Guyana and 2nd President of Guyana (b. 1923)
 John Harmon, American actor (b. 1905)
 August 8 – Louise Brooks, American actress (b. 1906)
 August 9 – Clive Churchill, Australian rugby league player and coach (b. 1927)
 August 10 – Kenny Baker, American actor and singer (b. 1912)
August 11 – Hector Grey, Scottish street trader and company director (b. 1904)
 August 12
 Kyu Sakamoto, Japanese singer (b. 1941)
 Manfred Winkelhock, German racing driver (b. 1951) 
 August 14 – Gale Sondergaard, American actress (b. 1899)
 August 15 – Lester Cole, American screenwriter, one of the Hollywood Ten (b. 1904)
 August 20 – Donald O. Hebb, Canadian neuropsychologist (b. 1904)
 August 22 – Paul Peter Ewald, German-born American crystallographer and physicist (b. 1888)
 August 24 – Morrie Ryskind, American dramatist (b. 1895)
 August 25
 Paul Harris, American actor (b. 1917)
 Samantha Smith, American schoolgirl activist (b. 1972)
 August 28 
 Ruth Gordon, American actress, screenwriter, and playwright (b. 1896)
 Miguel Otero Silva, Venezuelan writer (b. 1908)
 August 29 
 Evelyn Ankers, British actress (b. 1918)
 Patrick Barr, British actor (b. 1908)
 Paul Kligman, Canadian actor (b. 1923)
 August 30 – Taylor Caldwell, Anglo-American writer (b. 1900)
 August 31 – Macfarlane Burnet, Australian biologist, recipient of the Nobel Prize in Physiology or Medicine (b. 1899)

September

 September 1 
 Stefan Bellof, German racing driver and 1984 World SportsCars (Group C) Champion (b. 1957).
 Saunders Lewis, Welsh writer and founder of the Welsh National Party (Plaid Cymru) (born 1893)
 September 4
 Isabel Jeans, British actress (b. 1891)
 George O'Brien, American actor (b. 1899)
 September 6 – Rodney Robert Porter, English biochemist, recipient of the Nobel Prize in Physiology or Medicine (b. 1917)
 September 7
 Bruiser Kinard, American football player (Brooklyn Dodgers) and a member of the Pro Football Hall of Fame (b. 1914)
 José Zabala-Santos, Filipino cartoonist (b. 1911)
 George Pólya, Hungarian mathematician (b. 1887)
 September 8 – John Franklin Enders, American scientist, recipient of the Nobel Prize in Physiology or Medicine (b. 1897)
 September 9 – Paul Flory, American chemist, Nobel Prize laureate (b. 1910)
 September 10
 Ernst Öpik, Estonian astronomer and astrophysicist (b. 1893)
 Jock Stein, Scottish football player and manager (b. 1922)
 September 11
 William Alwyn, English composer (b. 1905)
 Henrietta Barnett, British Women's Royal Air Force officer (b. 1905)
 Masako Natsume, Japanese actress (b. 1957)
 September 13 – Augusto Rademaker, Brazilian admiral and former military junta member (b. 1905)
 September 14 
 Julian Beck, American actor (b. 1925)
 John Holt, American writer and educator (b. 1923)
 September 17 – Laura Ashley, Welsh designer (b. 1925)
 September 19 – Italo Calvino, Italian writer (b. 1923)
 September 22 – Axel Springer, German journalist and the founder and owner of the Axel Springer AG (b. 1912)
 September 27 – Lloyd Nolan, American actor (b. 1902)
 September 30
 Floyd Crosby, American cinematographer (b. 1899)
 Charles Francis Richter, American seismologist and physicist, creator of the Richter magnitude scale (b. 1900)
 Simone Signoret, French actress (b. 1921)

October

 October 1 – E. B. White, American writer (b. 1899)
 October 2
 Rock Hudson, American actor (b. 1925)
 George Savalas, American actor (b. 1924)
 October 5 – Abdus Sattar, Bangladeshi statesman, 8th President of Bangladesh (b. 1906)
 October 6 – Nelson Riddle, American bandleader (b. 1921)
 October 9 – Emílio Garrastazu Médici, Brazilian general and statesman, 28th President of Brazil (b. 1905)
 October 10
 Yul Brynner, Russian actor (b. 1920) 
 Orson Welles, American actor and director (b. 1915)
 October 12 – Ricky Wilson, American guitarist (b. 1953)
 October 13 – Francesca Bertini, Italian actress (b. 1892)
 October 14 – Emil Gilels, Soviet pianist (b. 1916)
 October 17 – Abdelmunim Al-Rifai, Prime Minister of Jordan (b. 1917)
 October 21 – Dan White, American politician and murderer (Moscone–Milk assassinations) (b. 1946)
 October 22 – Thomas Townsend Brown, American inventor (b. 1905)
 October 24 – László Bíró, Hungarian inventor of the ballpoint pen (b. 1899)
 October 29 – John Davis Lodge, American actor and politician (b. 1903)

November

 November 1
 Ōuchiyama Heikichi, Japanese sumo wrestler (b. 1926)
 Phil Silvers, American entertainer (b. 1911)
 November 5
 Spencer W. Kimball, president of the Church of Jesus Christ of Latter-day Saints (b. 1895)
 Arnold Chikobava, Georgian linguist (b. 1898)
 November 6 – Sanjeev Kumar, Indian actor (b. 1937)
 November 8 – Nicolas Frantz, Luxembourgian cyclist (b. 1899)
 November 9 – Marie-Georges Pascal, French actress (b. 1946)
 November 11
 James Hanley, British novelist, playwright and writer (b. 1897)
 Pelle Lindbergh, Swedish Professional Hockey goaltender (b. 1959)
 Arthur Rothstein, American photographer (b. 1915)
 November 13
 William Pereira, American architect (b. 1909)
 George Robert Vincent, American sound recording pioneer (b. 1898)
 November 14 – Wellington Koo, Chinese statesman (b. 1888)
 November 16 – John Sparkman, American politician (b. 1899)
 November 17
 Lon Nol, Cambodian general and statesman, 32nd Prime Minister of Cambodia and 7th President of Khmer Republic (b. 1913)
 Jimmy Ritz, American actor (b. 1904)
 November 19
 Juan Arvizu, Mexican operatic tenor and bolero vocalist (b. 1900) 
 Stepin Fetchit, American actor (b. 1902)
 November 24 – Big Joe Turner, American blues singer (b. 1911)
 November 25 – Geoffrey Grigson, British poet, writer, critic (b. 1905)
 November 27 – Fernand Braudel, French historian (b. 1902)
 November 28 – Johnny McNally, American football player, member of the Pro Football Hall of Fame (b. 1903)

December

 December 2 – Philip Larkin, English poet and novelist (b. 1922)
 December 7
 Robert Graves, English writer (b. 1895)
 Potter Stewart, American Supreme Court Justice (b. 1915)
 December 12
 Anne Baxter, American actress (b. 1923)
 Ian Stewart, Scottish rock musician (b. 1938)
 Phil Karlson, American film director (b. 1908)
 December 14 – Roger Maris, American baseball player (New York Yankees) (b. 1934)
 December 15
 Seewoosagur Ramgoolam, 1st Prime Minister of Mauritius (b. 1900)
 Carlos Romulo, Filipino diplomat (b. 1899)
 December 16 – Paul Castellano, American Mafia boss (b. 1915)
 December 20 – Coral Buttsworth, Australian tennis champion (b. 1900)
 December 22 – D. Boon, American singer, songwriter and guitarist (b. 1958)
 December 23
 Ferhat Abbas, Algerian nationalist, 1st president of the Provisional Government of the Algerian Republic (b. 1899)
 Prince Bira, Prince of Siam and Formula One driver (b. 1914)
 December 24 – Erich Schaedler, Scottish footballer (b. 1949)
 December 26 – Dian Fossey, American biologist (b. 1932)
 December 27
 Harry Hopman, Australian tennis player and coach (b. 1906)
 Harold Whitlock, British Olympic athlete (b. 1903)
 December 28 – Renato Castellani, Italian director (b. 1913)
 December 31
 Ricky Nelson, American actor and musician (b. 1940)
 Sam Spiegel, Polish-born film producer (b. 1903)

Date unknown
 Andrej Bicenko, Russian fresco painter and muralist (b. 1886)
 Kaare Bratung, Norwegian cartoonist (b. 1906)
 Hamlet Gonashvili, Georgian singer (b. 1928)

Nobel Prizes

 Physics – Klaus von Klitzing
 Chemistry – Herbert A. Hauptman, Jerome Karle
 Literature – Claude Simon
 Peace – International Physicians for the Prevention of Nuclear War
 Economics – Franco Modigliani
 Nobel Prize in Physiology or Medicine – Michael Stuart Brown, Joseph L. Goldstein

References